Selikhovy Dvory is a rural locality in Novoposelenovsky Selsoviet Rural Settlement, Kursky District, Kursk Oblast, Russia. Population:

Geography 
The village is located 74 km from the Russia–Ukraine border, 16 km south-west of Kursk, 6 km from the selsoviet center – 1st Tsvetovo.

 Streets
There are the following streets in the locality: Gorodskaya, Druzhby, Molodyozhnaya, Okruzhnaya and Tsentralnaya (184 houses).

 Climate
Selikhovy Dvory has a warm-summer humid continental climate (Dfb in the Köppen climate classification).

Transport 
Selikhovy Dvory is located on the federal route  Crimea Highway (a part of the European route ) and on the road of regional importance  ("Crimea Highway" – Ivanino, part of the European route ), 8 km from the nearest railway halt 457 km (railway line Lgov I — Kursk).

The rural locality is situated 24 km from Kursk Vostochny Airport, 108 km from Belgorod International Airport and 220 km from Voronezh Peter the Great Airport.

References

Notes

Sources

Rural localities in Kursky District, Kursk Oblast